Nightmare Diaries is the second full-length album by Norwegian band Ancestral Legacy, released under the British independent record label Femme Metal Records on March 1, 2010, after signing a contract in December 2008.

Background
Nightmare Diaries was recorded in late 2007 and masterized in mid-2008 by guitarist Knut Magne Valle (Arcturus, Ulver, Fleurety) at Mølla Studio in Gjerstad. However, it wasn't published until almost a year and a half later,  due to production delays.

It is the last album recorded with singer Elin Anita Omholt, who left the band in the late 2008.

Releases 
The album was released in two versions: CD and Promo. Promo version includes a plastic sleeve with a two sided paper insert, front cover image with "PROMO COPY" in white letters, back side band picture, a short biography and album info.

Track listing

Personnel

Ancestral Legacy 
Elin Anita Omholt - Vocals (female)
Eddie Risdal - Guitars, Vocals (harsh)
Tor Larsen – Guitar
Anton Dead – Bass
Christopher Midtsvéen Vigre - Drums

Guest/session musicians 
Knut Magne Valle - Guitar solo on "Out Of The Dark And Into The Night", effects
Silje - Child's cry on "Still"
Jason Deaville - Spoken parts on "...My Departed"

Production and engineering 
Produced by Ancestral Legacy
Remixed & remastered by Knut Magne Valle

References

External links 
Discogs.com
Metallum Archives

2010 albums
Ancestral Legacy albums